Lovejoy is an English surname. Notable people with the surname include:

 Allen P. Lovejoy, American politician
 Arthur Oncken Lovejoy (1873–1962), American philosopher and intellectual historian
 Asa Lovejoy (1808–1882), American pioneer and politician, founder of Portland, Oregon
 Ben Lovejoy (born 1984), American ice hockey player
 Deirdre Lovejoy (born 1962), American actress 
 Elijah Parish Lovejoy (1802–1837), American journalist and abolitionist, brother of Owen
 Esther Pohl Lovejoy (1869–1967), American physician and activist
 F. T. F. Lovejoy (1854–1932), American industrialist
 Frank Lovejoy (1912–1962), American actor
 George Lovejoy (died 2003), Australian rugby league commentator
 George A. Lovejoy (New Hampshire politician) (1931–2015), American politician and businessman
 George A. Lovejoy (Washington politician) (1879–1944)
 Lynda Lovejoy (born 1949), Navajo politician
 Owen Lovejoy (1811–1864), American congressman and abolitionist, brother of Elijah
 Owen Lovejoy (anthropologist) (born 1943), American evolutionary biologist
 Paul Lovejoy, Canadian historian
 Robin Lovejoy (1924-1985), Australian theatre director and actor
 Spencer Lovejoy (born 1998), American squash player
 Terry Lovejoy, Australian amateur astronomer
 Thomas Lovejoy (1941–2021), American biologist
 Tim Lovejoy (born 1968), British television presenter

Fictional characters:
 Reverend Timothy Lovejoy, a recurring character in the animated television series The Simpsons
 Helen Lovejoy,  wife of the above
 Lovejoy, a fictional antiques dealer of eponymous novels and television

English-language surnames